Francis Thomas Cox (4 December 192010 November 2007) and Frederick Cox (4 December 192028 September 2013), known as The Cox Twins, were British entertainers in the Music Hall tradition. They were identical twin brothers.

Their career began with Steffani's Songsters and they then appeared in the Ralph Reader RAF Gang Shows during World War II, touring Europe and North Africa. Later they went into Variety, performing in summer seasons and pantomime. They married twins sisters, Estelle and Pauline Miles, who became part of their act. In 1972 they appeared as Tweedledum and Tweedledee in the film Alice's Adventures in Wonderland. Other films in which the twins appeared include Up Jumped a Swagman (1965) with Frank Ifield, as the "Book People" "Pride" and "Prejudice" in Fahrenheit 451 (1966) as well as  Funny Bones (1995) with Lee Evans and Jerry Lewis. Their numerous television appearances included Barrymore and The Story of Light Entertainment (2006) with Stephen Fry and Simon Cowell.

When Frank's wife, Estelle, died in 1984, Fred's wife continued to appear with the twins, the act being known as "The Cox Twins and Pauline". They were presented with Lifetime Achievement Rose Bowls by the British Music Hall Society.

By 2007, their public appearances were limited to RAF reunions. Frank Cox died on 10 November 2007; Fred Cox died on 28 September 2013.

References

External links

British entertainers
British identical twins
Music hall performers
1920 births
2007 deaths
2013 deaths
Male actors from Cardiff
Place of birth missing
Royal Air Force personnel of World War II